The Europe Zone was one of the two regional zones of the 1938 International Lawn Tennis Challenge.

21 teams entered the Europe Zone, with the winner going on to compete in the Inter-Zonal Final against the winner of the America Zone. Germany defeated Yugoslavia in the final, and went on to face Australia in the Inter-Zonal Final.

Draw

First round

Netherlands vs. France

Poland vs. Denmark

Ireland vs. Italy

Great Britain vs. Romania

Yugoslavia vs. Czechoslovakia

Second round

Germany vs. Norway

France vs. Monaco

Italy vs. Poland

Yugoslavia vs. Great Britain

Sweden vs. Switzerland

Greece vs. Belgium

Quarterfinals

Hungary vs. Germany

France vs. Italy

Yugoslavia vs. Sweden

Belgium vs. India

Semifinals

Germany vs. France

Belgium vs. Yugoslavia

Final

Germany vs. Yugoslavia

Notes

References

External links
Davis Cup official website

Davis Cup Europe/Africa Zone
Europe Zone
International Lawn Tennis Challenge